Capability-based Reliable Operating System (CapROS) is an operating system incorporating pure capability-based security. It features automatic persistence of data and processes, even across system reboots. Capability systems naturally support the principle of least authority, which improves security and fault tolerance. It is free and open-source software released under the GNU General Public License version 2 (GPLv2), and GNU Lesser General Public License version 2 (LGPLv2).

CapROS is an evolution of the Extremely Reliable Operating System (EROS). While EROS was purely a research system, CapROS is intended to be a stable system of commercial quality. CapROS currently runs on Intel IA-32 and ARM microprocessors.

CapROS is being developed by Strawberry Development Group with funding from the Defense Advanced Research Projects Agency (DARPA) and others. The primary developer is Charles Landau.

History
The CapROS project was formed in 2005 as a non-academic continuation of EROS. The EROS system in turn traces its architecture to KeyKOS and ultimately GNOSIS.

See also

External links
 
 
 

Free software operating systems
Capability systems